Rabbit Transit may refer to:

rabbittransit, the public bus service that operates in Pennsylvania and Maryland
Rabbit Transit (film), a 1947 Looney Tunes cartoon
Rabbit Transit (game), an Atari 2600 game based on the Looney Tunes cartoon